Beazley is a surname, and may refer to

 Charles Raymond Beazley, British historian
 Christopher Beazley, British politician
 David M. Beazley, American software engineer
 John Beazley, British classical scholar
 Kim Beazley, current Australian politician
 Kim Beazley Sr., Australian politician
 Margaret Beazley, Australian jurist
 Napoleon Beazley, convicted murderer
 Risdon Beazley, marine salvage operator
 Beazley Insurance, a UK headquartered insurance company

See also
 Miss Beazley (character)
 Miss Beazley (dog)
 Beazley Group
 Beazley Medal
 G. A. Beazeley
 Beasley (surname)
 Beesley, surname

English toponymic surnames